2-1-1 is a special abbreviated telephone number reserved in the North American Numbering Plan (NANP) as an easy-to-remember three-digit code to reach information and referral services to health, human, and social service organizations.

Like the emergency telephone number 9-1-1, 2-1-1 is one of the eight N11 codes of the North American Numbering Plan (NANP).

History

United States
For many years, New York Telephone (now a unit of Verizon) used 2-1-1 as an automated credit request number for disconnected or misdialed calls. This service was in service from the 1970s through the early 2000s.

Before the introduction of direct long-distance dialing, the long-distance operator was reached by dialing 2-1-1 for placing a long-distance call. When the states in the US and  provinces in  Canada were assigned area codes in 1947 by the American Telephone and Telegraph Company (AT&T), direct distance dialing (DDD) using the area code and the local number was introduced starting in 1951, eventually eliminating the use of the prefix. After that, the local telephone providers designated "00" for long-distance operator access.

In 1986, the United Way of San Diego created its INFO LINE in partnership with the County and City of San Diego. The United Way of Metropolitan Atlanta introduced a 2-1-1 service in 1997. Many states began implementation plans soon after, aided by the United Way of America in partnership with the Alliance of Information and Referral Systems (AIRS). On July 20, 2000, the Federal Communications Commission (FCC) approved 2-1-1 for nationwide use as a short number in the United States along with 5-1-1 for transportation. In Texas, particularly in the Coastal Bend area, 2-1-1 is also the number to call for elderly and disabled people needing evacuation assistance in the event of a pending disaster such as a hurricane. The role of libraries in information and referral including 2-1-1 has been considered with a case study in Mississippi,

As of 2017, close to 95% of the population in the U.S. (including Puerto Rico and Washington, DC) has access to 2-1-1 services. More than two-hundred agencies, including United Ways, provide 2-1-1 services. The largest population without access to 2-1-1 is the metro-Chicago area. In 2017, the 2-1-1 network in the U.S. answered close to 15 million requests for assistance through phone, text, and web chat.

Canada
The Canadian Radio-television and Telecommunications Commission (CRTC) approved the use of 2-1-1 throughout Canada on August 9, 2001. The first Canadian 2-1-1 service opened in Toronto on June 13, 2002. 2-1-1 services are free of charge and multilingual in Canada.

As of October 2020, the whole of Canada, including the territories, has had access to 2–1-1 thanks to a nationwide expansion, following the COVID-19 pandemic.

In Canada, 2-1-1 offers free and confidential information and referral for all non emergency needs.

Operation 
2-1-1 center hours vary. Many are open 24/7 to refer callers to organizations that provide services in such areas as:

Addiction counseling
Affordable housing
Alzheimer's assistance
Child care
Debt counseling
Disaster relief
Donation opportunities
Education
Emergency food, such as food banks and soup kitchens
ESL
Financial assistance
Homeless services
Job counseling
Parenting programs
Psychotherapy counseling
Senior citizen programs
Suicide prevention
Telephone reassurance, care for the elderly
Volunteer opportunities
Youth programs

Where available, 2-1-1 is operated by a private non-profit community-service organization, local government or local United Ways, which are part of the broader United Way Worldwide network. 2-1-1 provides information and referral to callers on where to obtain assistance from local and national social service programs, local and national governmental agencies and local and national non-profit organizations as well as where to volunteer or make a donation locally. Referrals are often given from databases accessed by call specialists. These databases are maintained by 2-1-1 staff following stringent data management guidelines. The databases are typically local but in some cases linked together to form statewide databases.

Many 2-1-1 centers are exploring Memorandums of Understanding with state and federal governments to facilitate the efficient handling of future disasters. Television or radio stations could easily tell citizens to call 2-1-1 in the event of an emergency. Call specialists at these centers would be informed of current disaster plans or places to receive help and could then inform the public of the correct course of action. After Hurricanes Harvey, Irma, and Maria in Florida, Texas, Puerto Rico, and the Gulf Coast region, 2-1-1 centers were instrumental in coordinating with local government officials and providing information to communities before and after local disasters. Furthermore, 2-1-1 providers in Massachusetts, Connecticut, and Florida were called upon to provide assistance to individuals fleeing Puerto Rico's devastation.

Availability

United States 
As of May 2017, the service is available in all 50 states and Washington, D.C. and 95% of the U.S. population has access to 2-1-1 services by dialing 2-1-1 on a landline or cell phone. In 2017, the 2-1-1 network answered close to 15 million requests for assistance by phone, text, and chat.

Canada 
In Canada, 2-1-1 is available in the following places (starting dates in parentheses). Note that this list may be out-of-date; 2-1-1 service coverage is generally expanding over time.

Nova Scotia — 211 Nova Scotia
 province-wide (February 11, 2013)

New Brunswick — 211 New Brunswick
 province-wide (October 15, 2020)

Quebec — 211 Grand Montréal and 211 Québec régions
 Capitale-Nationale Region (April 2008)
 Chaudière-Appalaches Region (April 2008)
 La Haute-Yamaska
 Laval Region (October 2016)
 Greater Montreal (April 2018)

Ontario — 211 Ontario
 Algoma District (September 2010)
 Bruce County (February 2009)
 Frontenac County (June 2010)
 Grey County (February 2009)
 Haliburton County (September 2009)
 Halton Region (2007)
 Huron County (June 2010)
 Kawartha Lakes (September 2009)
 Kingston (June 2010)
 Lennox and Addington County (June 2010)
 London (October 2011)
 Muskoka District (November 2008)
 Niagara Region (November 2005)
 Northumberland County (May 2009)
 Ottawa (September 19, 2008)
 Oxford County (September 2010)
 Peel Region (May 2008)
 Perth County (June 2010)
 Peterborough County (June 2009)
 Renfrew County (February 2011)
 Sault Ste. Marie (September 2009)
 Simcoe County (November 2005)
 Thunder Bay (February 2008)
 Toronto (June 2002)
 Waterloo Region (May 2011)
 Windsor-Essex County (November 2007)

Saskatchewan — United Way 211
 province-wide (September 2013)

Alberta — 211 Alberta
 Calgary (2005)
 Edmonton (2004)

British Columbia — bc211
 Fraser Valley Regional District (October 2010)
 Metro Vancouver (October 2010)
 Sunshine Coast Regional District
 Squamish-Lillooet Regional District (October 2011)
 Vancouver Island\Gulf Islands (September 2017)

The Windsor Star has reported on March 20, 2003, that Windsor, Ontario intended to have a 2-1-1 service up by 2009, as the Provincial Government allocated $311,000 to start it up, with much of the money being donated by the United Way of Canada, but had a set time limit on how long those funds would be available. On November 26, 2007, the City of Windsor's website announced that 2-1-1 service for Windsor and Essex County began, and was being run by the United Way (who also runs the local 3-1-1 service).

Plans to introduce 2-1-1 services are also in development in other Canadian communities. Ontario extended 2-1-1 province-wide in 2012 and Nova Scotia's province-wide 2-1-1 deployment will be fully operational in 2014. In British Columbia, 2-1-1 services are administered by bc211, and is available on Vancouver Island\Gulf Islands and in the Metro Vancouver, Squamish-Lillooet, Sunshine Coast Regional District and Fraser Valley and regional districts, with plans to expand the services provincially.

In some communities, unused X-1-1 codes were assigned as plant test numbers for telephone installers testing individual lines. In the Canadian province of Prince Edward Island, for instance, when 2-1-1 was dialed, it caused a busy signal to occur and the dialer's telephone line would "go dead" for several minutes afterward. These codes must first be "recovered" by moving the test functions elsewhere (958 and 959 are standard reserved local and long-distance test exchanges in most areas) to permit redeployment as local public information numbers.

Accreditation

United States 
The American accrediting body for 2-1-1 centers is the Alliance of Information & Referral Systems (AIRS). AIRS provides an accreditation process for 2-1-1 centers and certifies 2-1-1 Call Center Representatives as Certified Information and Referral Specialists (CIRS), Certified Information and Referral Specialists for Aging (CIRS-A) and Certified Resource Specialists (CRS) annually. AIRS standards have been created to provide a benchmark for 2-1-1 centers and its staff. The standards regulate nationally how a 2-1-1 centers provides services and how they collect and store information.

INFOLINE of Los Angeles, an information and referral services agency serving the greater Los Angeles area, developed a national taxonomy of human services that provides a standard language for information and referral providers nationally. AIRS adopted this taxonomy as its national standard for use in the field of information and referral.  This taxonomy provides standard definition of terms, an exact coding structure for referrals and search methodology for providing referrals to consumers.

Accredited 2-1-1 centers must have active Memorandums of Understanding with local 9-1-1 service as well as domestic violence providers, elder care providers, mental health providers and local law enforcement.

Canada 
In Canada, professional certification is handled by InformCanada InformCanada - Fédération Inform Canada. The national 211 initiative is a partnership between InformCanada and United Way of Canada – Centraide Canada.

Work is underway to create a bilingual, Canadian Taxonomy of human services based on the AIRS/Infoline Taxonomy. This project is led by InformCanada and significant steps have been made on the creation of a starter taxonomy by the 211 Ontario phase 2 project, funded by the Ontario Trillium Foundation and the government of Canada. Updates on the Canadian Taxonomy Project are maintained by 211.ca.

Implementation process 
The number 2-1-1 must be captured and approved for assigning through the local telecom companies providing services in the local area. The process of implementing a 2-1-1 service in a community has taken many paths since its beginning in 1997. Some places have a centralized statewide system while others have decentralized regional networks with different types of affiliations.

In the United States, each implementation is monitored by the national accrediting entity Alliance of Information & Referral Systems (AIRS) and its local statewide affiliate.

In Canada, the deployment of 2-1-1 service is subject to InformCanada accreditation and Canadian Radio-television and Telecommunications Commission (CRTC) approval.

See also

 Crisis hotline
 Fighting poverty
 Social services
 Speed dial
 National Suicide Prevention Lifeline (9-8-8)

References

External links 
FCC fact sheet on 2-1-1
2-1-1 Information & Referral Search
AIRS/Infoline Taxonomy of Human Services

Geriatrics
Three-digit telephone numbers